There are episode lists for all three series in the Knight Rider franchise:

 List of Knight Rider (1982 TV series) episodes
 List of Team Knight Rider episodes
 List of Knight Rider (2008 TV series) episodes